Filmography of Toshio Masuda

Between 1958 and 1992, Toshio Masuda directed 82 feature films, 52 of those over the course of a decade at the Nikkatsu Company.

References

External links 
 http://www.jmdb.ne.jp/person/p0238140.htm

Director filmographies